Govt.Ganapath High School for Boys, Chalappuram in Calicut is one of the oldest high schools in Kerala. It was built by the Late Mr. Ganapath Rao in 1886.

Notable alumni
V. K. Krishna Menon former Union minister for defence
K. P. Kesava Menon, Chief Editor of Mathrubhoomi, Malayalam daily.
S. K. Pottekkatt, Malayalam Writer
Shajoon Karyal, Malayalam film director
PP Ummer Koya, Education Minister, Government of Kerala
Mannikoth Ramunni Nair aka M.R Nair or Sanjayan, Malayalam satirist
P. M. Aboobacker, Minister for Public Works
K. P. Ummer, Malayalam Cine Actor
P. V. Gangadharan, Film Producer and Businessman
T. Damodaran, Screenwriter
Hareesh Kanaran, Actor
Nishanth Sagar, Actor

Schools in Kozhikode
Educational institutions established in 1886
High schools and secondary schools in Kerala
1886 establishments in India